Baegamsan (Jeollanam-do) is a mountain of Jeollanam-do, western South Korea. It has an elevation of 742 metres.

See also
List of mountains of Korea

References

Mountains of South Jeolla Province
Mountains of North Jeolla Province
Jangseong County
Sunchang County
Mountains of South Korea